Sanepar is a Brazilian water and waste management company owned by Paraná state. It provides water and sewage services to residential, commercial and industrial users in 345 cities and another 293 smaller areas in Paraná and on the city of Porto União, Santa Catarina state. It provides water to 26.7 million customers, or 60% of the population of the state. It is one of the largest water and waste management company in Brazil. It provides basic sanitation services, which include all phases (abstraction, treatment, processing distribution) and the collection, treatment and reuse of sewage. It has an 84,600 kilometer network for the withdrawal and distribution of drinking water, for sewage collection and for the discharge of treated sewage. Regarding solid waste, it operates landfills in Apucarana, Cornélio Procópio and Cianorte.

Headquartered in Curitiba, Sanepar provides a universal water supply network in all the municipalities it serves. 100% of the sewage it collects is treated before discharge into water bodies.

In addition Sanepar also has a 40% stake in CS Bioenergia S.A., a special purpose enterprise incorporated in partnership with Cattalini Bioenergia to exploit sewage-based energy generation at the biodigestion unit implanted next to the Belém wastewater treatment plant in Curitiba. The activities of CS Bioenergia will comply with Brazilian national solid waste policy governing the non-generation/reduction, reuse, treatment and disposal of waste.

History

Sanepar was founded in 1963 as Agepar. Today its stocks are traded on the São Paulo Stock Exchange.

References

External links
  Official Home Page

Waste management companies of Brazil
Companies listed on B3 (stock exchange)
Companies based in Curitiba
Government-owned companies of Brazil
Waste companies established in 1963
Brazilian companies established in 1963